Wallace-Baily Tavern is a historic home that also served as an inn and tavern located at Redstone Township, Fayette County, Pennsylvania.  It was built about 1840, and is a -story, 3-bay, stone building. It has a frame kitchen ell an features a double stacked portico with Greek Revival design influences. The ruins of a wash house/summer kitchen are also on site.  The tavern served as a stop for 19th-century travelers on the National Road.

It was added to the National Register of Historic Places in 1995.

References

Houses on the National Register of Historic Places in Pennsylvania
Houses completed in 1840
Greek Revival houses in Pennsylvania
Houses in Fayette County, Pennsylvania
National Register of Historic Places in Fayette County, Pennsylvania